El Sol Latino ("The Latin Sun") is a monthly bilingual newspaper published by El Coquí Media Group of Amherst, Massachusetts, primarily in English and Spanish. Though published in Amherst, the newspaper's content additionally covers news in Holyoke, Springfield, and Hartford extensively as the paper's primary focus is news and advocacy in the greater Puerto Rican community. Founded in 2004, the paper was started by Manuel Frau Ramos, a former professor of education at the University of Massachusetts Amherst, as well as the University of Puerto Rico.

Contributors to the paper include local activists, advocates from organizations such as Nueva Esperanza, and including but not limited to faculty of Holyoke Community College, Springfield College, and the University of Massachusetts Amherst. The paper often features profiles of leading figures in Puerto Rican culture, including Oscar López Rivera, Frank Bonilla, and San Juan mayor Carmen Yulín Cruz.

References

External links
 El Sol Latino, Issuu, current editions
 El Sol Latino Archives, The Springfield Institute (incomplete)

Bilingual newspapers
2004 establishments in Massachusetts
Publications established in 2004
Newspapers published in Massachusetts
Monthly newspapers
Mass media in Hampshire County, Massachusetts
Mass media in Hampden County, Massachusetts
Spanish-language newspapers published in the United States